Elmore County High School is a public high school in Eclectic, Alabama. It is a part of the Elmore County Public School System.

In 2006, as part of renovations, the school was to receive a new band room.

In 2007 the Burt-Haynie Stadium at the school was to be renovated.

References

External links

 Elmore County High School

Schools in Elmore County, Alabama
Public high schools in Alabama